Keuka College is a private college in Keuka Park, New York.  Founded in 1890, the college emphasizes experiential learning as well as career and pre-professional education.  It is classified among "Master's Colleges and Universities (small)" and is accredited by the Middle States Commission on Higher Education.  The college offers both bachelor's and master's degrees on its home campus.

Keuka's Accelerated Studies for Adults Program (ASAP) offers degree completion at more than 20 sites throughout Upstate New York, as well as through online courses. Since the early 2000s, Keuka has also become a major educational provider in the Pacific Rim, with more than 3,000 students pursuing Keuka degrees at partner universities in China and Vietnam.

The school is situated on Keuka Lake with more than a thousand feet of shoreline, including Point Neamo, a private beach with a boat house and equipment for checkout by college students and staff.

History
Keuka College was founded in 1890 by George Harvey Ball (1819-1907) who envisioned a college that would provide a high-level education to all deserving students, regardless of economic background. The first academic building was dedicated on August 14, 1890.  In an article published the next day, The New York Times noted that the hall was built on "one of the most beautiful locations on the Keuka Lake," and that it was "a firm-looking building, four stories in height, of brick and stone."  The freshman class in Fall 1890 consisted of eighty students.

The college faced financial troubles and decided to suspend active instruction in 1915.  In 1919, Arthur H. Norton (after whom the Norton Chapel is named) was chosen as the President of Keuka and worked to revitalize the college.  Under Norton, who would serve as president for the next 16 years, Keuka resumed instruction in 1921 as Keuka College for Women.  During this trying time (1919-1921), Norton personally wrote more than 3,000 letters, published and mailed at least 10,000 pamphlets, made 66 speeches, and surveyed 76 colleges in order to advance Keuka's cause.  Dr. Gertrude Martin, former dean of women at Cornell University, became a Keuka trustee and advised the now women's college.  The Ball Brothers—founders of what would become the Ball Corporation, a S&P 500 company, and benefactors of Ball State University—were among the key supporters of Keuka at this time.  Years earlier, with their father in poor health, the young Ball brothers "found a friend and confidant in their uncle," George Harvey Ball.  When the Ball brothers' father, Lucius Styles Ball, died, Uncle George provided financial support and some measure of stability to the young Ball brothers.  George Harvey Ball also provided his nephews with funds that helped launch their successful enterprise.  The Ball brothers expressed their gratitude to their uncle by supporting Keuka College, donating land and providing funds.  In recognition of this, the first academic building was renamed Ball Hall (Ball Memorial Hall) in 1921 after founder and first President George Harvey Ball and the Ball Brothers  The Ball Family also supported Hillsdale College in Michigan.  In 1924, Hegeman Hall and Richardson Hall (later renamed Harrington Hall) were built.  Both of these buildings remain key buildings on campus today, flanking Ball Hall.

During World War II, Keuka College expanded its nursing program in order to provide professionally trained nurses for the war effort, due in no small part to the personal correspondence between Keuka President J. Hillis Miller and the First Lady, Eleanor Roosevelt, who visited the college on February 16, 1938.  Keuka's emphasis on experiential learning meant that it had a nursing program combining "academic study in the classroom and clinical work at the hospital."    On June 16, 1963, a quarter century after Roosevelt's visit, Rev. Dr. Martin Luther King Jr. delivered the baccalaureate address at the college and received an honorary Doctor of Humane Letters.  Since 2017, two busts featuring Roosevelt and King have commemorated their visits; these busts were funded by Christine and Donald Wertman and sculpted by the college's own Professor Emeritus of Art, Dr. Dexter Benedict.  Keuka remained a single-sex institution until 1985, when declining enrollment at that time (from 536 total students in 1979 to 407 students in 1984) caused the board of trustees to vote in favor of admitting men.  Since then, enrollment has increased to over 1,100 students .

In the late 2000s, with the help of donations from alumni and friends of the college, the original building, Ball Hall, was restored.  The three-year renovation of the historical centerpiece of the campus received a Citation Award from the American Institute for Architects-Central New York (AIA CNY) in 2008.  In 2016, the Keuka Commons was dedicated.  This new building houses the Division of Business and Management, the Center for Professional Studies, the Wertman Office of Digital Education, the Center for Business Analytics and Health Informatics, a state-of-the-art trading room, classrooms, study spaces, the campus bookstore, and the Wolf Den Café, which serves Starbucks coffee as well as pastries, sandwiches, salads, and other snacks.

Field Period 

In 1942, Edith Estey, a 1933 Keuka graduate and administrator, created the Field Period program, which continues to be a major component of a Keuka College education as administered through the Center for Experiential Learning. During a Field Period, each Keuka student is required to spend 140 hours per year (or approximately one month) in a self-directed learning experience. This can involve a work internship, a community service project, spiritual exploration, personal development, cross-cultural diversity exploration, or a group cultural experience to another city or country.

The student is graded on a pass and fail basis with the potential to earn three credits.  The Field Period can be completed over summer break or winter break, as students have the month of January off. Students design a learning contract with the site of  their choice that outlines learning goals and objectives that must be met. Each student's site supervisor evaluates the student's work ethic and progress and reports back to Keuka College's Experiential Learning office. Upon completion, students meet with their academic advisors to present unique documentation of the experience and hand in a recap paper and reflective journal.

In his book, Cool Colleges: For the Hyper-Intelligent, Self-Directed, Late Blooming, and Just Plain Different, author Donald Asher observes that Keuka College "does a fantastic job of tying classroom experience to the real world" and "has a holistic approach to make an intentional, coherent experience out of all of a student's classroom, activity, internship, and field experiences."

Academics 
Keuka College offers 31 bachelor's degree programs on its home campus, many with specialized concentrations; there are also 27 minors and self-designed majors.  In addition, Keuka offers seven master's degree programs and pre-professional programs in dentistry, law, medicine, veterinary medicine, optometry, pharmacy, and occupational therapy.  Some of the key academic offices and research and learning centers at Keuka include: the Office of the Vice President for Academic Affairs; Academic Success at Keuka (ASK); Accelerated Studies for Adults (ASAP); the Center for Aquatic Research; the Center for Experiential Learning; the Center for Global Education; and the Lightner Library.

Keuka places emphasis on experiential education through its Field Period, a student-designed internship every year while enrolled. In addition to meeting the needs of traditional students, Keuka's Accelerated Studies for Adults Program (ASAP) offers bachelor's degree completion and master's degree programs at locales around the state.

Keuka has an international presence, particularly in the Asia-Pacific region, with around 2,680 Chinese students pursuing Keuka degrees at four partner universities, one of the largest enrollments of any U.S. college operating in the country.  The Keuka-China international educational partnership has the approval of the Office of Academic Degrees Committee for the State Council in China.  Another 505 Vietnamese students are doing likewise at two partner universities in Vietnam. More than 110 international students from different countries study on the home campus.

Academic offices and centers 

 Academic Affairs—The Office of the Vice President for Academic Affairs provides leadership for all academic programs in support of the college mission and ensures academic excellence.  The academic affairs office also has responsibility for those academic units that support student success: the Registrar, the Lightner Library, the Center for Experiential Learning, Educational Technology, institutional research, and the Academic Success at Keuka (ASK) Program.  Other responsibilities of the office include the development, review, and implementation of academic policies and procedures; assessment; budgeting for academic programs; and faculty personnel actions, including re-appointment, promotion, and tenure.
 Academic Success at Keuka (ASK)—In addition to providing services to students with disabilities, ASK is also available to help all students enhance study skills, improve time management, and earn better grades through peer and professional tutoring in writing and other subjects.
 Accelerated Studies for Adults Program (ASAP)—Individual degree programs are designed to meet the needs of busy, active adults—classes are offered at more than 20 hospitals and community colleges throughout New York state.  More below.
 Center for Aquatic Research (CAR)—The Center capitalizes on Keuka College's excellent location on the shore of Keuka Lake and engages in research, teaching, and outreach.  Research has been conducted on the ecological impacts from deep chlorophyll layers (DCL) in Keuka Lake.  CAR researchers have worked with researchers from Cornell University, Hobart and William Smith Colleges, and Finger Lakes Community College and other institutions on a state-funded project that investigates water quality issues on Owasco Lake.  CAR researchers have also presented their findings at regional and national scientific conferences.  In addition, the center hosts summer workshops for area high school science teachers as well as people interested in the aquatic ecology of Keuka Lake and of the larger Finger Lakes region.  CAR has had an international aquatic research partnership with Wenzhou University on the east coast of China.
 Center for Experiential Learning—The Center for Experiential Learning serves as a bridge, connecting internships, the classroom and co-curricular activities, into a mutually reinforcing learning network. Interns have worked in local and out-of-state hospitals, schools, day care centers, set up Web sites for nonprofit groups, connecting lessons in video art with the digital nuts and bolts of the workplace; accounting majors have helped with auditing at major companies, including KPMG, one of the "Big Four" auditors in the world.  Experiential Learning is the central focus of the student experience, which gives students the Keuka advantage, namely, real-world experience for the 21st century, enabling them to build up ties, skill sets, and experiences even before they graduate and enter the world force or graduate or professional programs.  Experiential learning at Keuka occurs in the classroom, co-curricular activities, the workplace, and the community. It is integrated and weaves throughout the four years, and begins day one.
 Center for Global Education—The Center serves Keuka students on the Keuka Lake home campus who look for opportunities to study abroad, or for information about the college's many international ties.  It also serves international students looking to study at Keuka College in the United States, and Keuka China or Keuka Vietnam students interested in Keuka College's exchange programs.
 Lightner Library and the Aben and Lightner Art Galleries—The Lightner Library houses books, journals, computer labs, and electronic resources.  It is also home to two art galleries.  The Robert S. & Rebecca Bannan Aben Gallery features the work of world-renowned artist Yankel Ginzburg.  The Ginzburg art was donated to the college by the Aben Family.  The Lightner Art Gallery has showcased the works of local and regional artists, as well as those of Keuka students, on a rotating, monthly basis for the past 25 years.
 Office of the Registrar

Adult education
The Keuka College Center for Professional Studies Accelerated Studies for Adults Program (ASAP) offers degree completion and master's programs for working students. Classes are held one evening a week at community college and hospital locations throughout Upstate New York, including Syracuse, Auburn, Corning, Rochester, and other locations.  Bachelor's degrees can be earned in management, criminal justice, nursing for RNs, and social work. Master's degrees are available in criminal justice administration, management, and nursing.

Athletics 
Keuka College teams participate as a member of the National Collegiate Athletic Association's Division III. The Wolves (formerly known as the Storm until 2014) are a member of the Empire 8 Conference and of the Eastern College Athletic Conference (ECAC). They formerly competed as a member of the North Eastern Athletic Conference (NEAC), now known as the United East Conference. Men's sports include baseball, basketball, cross country, golf, lacrosse, soccer, tennis and volleyball; while women's sports include basketball, cross country, golf, lacrosse, soccer, softball, tennis, field hockey and volleyball.

Following the threat of a lawsuit by North Carolina State University, Keuka College decided to forego litigation and discontinue the "Wolfpack" name. They are now called the "Wolves."

Living options

Residence halls 
Keuka College is primarily a residential institution where most students live on campus. All halls offer common study areas, pantries, TV lounges, phone and cable connections, and Internet access.  Laundry is included with room and board.

 Saunders Hall – single sex hall available to freshmen women.
 Davis Hall - freshmen & upper class co-ed hall.
 Harrington Hall – available to upper class students and transfers.  This residence hall, built in 1924, places emphasis on leadership and cooperative living.  The rooms are suite-style and there is an additional $250 charge per year.
 Ball Hall – the original building on campus in 1890 and renovated in 2005, it is available only to upper class and transfer students. Rooms are available in quads, triples, doubles, and singles with an additional $325 charge per year.  The main floors and basement of Ball Hall also serve administrative functions.
 Blyley Hall – freshmen & upper class co-ed hall.
Space Hall - co-ed, all freshmen hall.
Strong Apartments - co-ed living for juniors and seniors.
 Keuka Park Apartments - co-ed living for juniors and seniors.

Exceptions to living on campus 
 23 years or older
 Married
 Dependent(s) under 18 years of age living with him/her
 Internship/practicum which requires site residency and/or is more than 30 miles from the Keuka College campus
 Medical or mental hardship
 Other compelling circumstances

Memberships and accreditations
 Middle States Association of Colleges and Secondary Schools
 Council on Social Work Education
 Commission on Collegiate Nursing Education
 Accreditation Council for Occupational Therapy Education of the American Occupational Therapy Association
 International Assembly of Collegiate Business Education
 Keuka College is a member of the Rochester Area Colleges consortium

References

External links 
 Official website
 Official athletics website

Private universities and colleges in New York (state)
Liberal arts colleges in New York (state)
Universities and colleges affiliated with the American Baptist Churches USA
Educational institutions established in 1890
Education in Yates County, New York
1890 establishments in New York (state)
Free Will Baptist schools
Empire 8 schools
Former United East Conference schools